The Danish ironclad Lindormen was a monitor built for the Royal Danish Navy in the 1860s. She was scrapped in 1907.

Description
Her crew consisted of 150 officers and enlisted men.

Lindormen had two horizontal direct-acting steam engines, built by Burmeister & Wain, each driving one propeller shaft.

She was initially armed with two Armstrong  rifled muzzle-loading (RML) guns mounted in a single turret. In 1876 a pair of  RML guns were added. Four years later a pair of  rifled breech-loading guns were also added and the 76-millimeter guns were replaced by another pair of 87-millimeter breech-loading guns in 1885. The 227-millimeter guns were ultimately replaced by a pair of  quick-firing  guns.

The gun turret was protected by  armor plates. The conning tower armor was also 127 millimeters thick.

Construction and career
Lindormen, named for a serpent from Norse legend, was laid down by the Naval Dockyard in Copenhagen on 20 July 1866, launched on 8 August 1868 and completed on 15 August 1869. She was stricken from the Navy List on 29 June 1907 and sold for scrap. The ship was broken up in the Netherlands.

Notes

References
 
 
 

Ironclad warships of the Royal Danish Navy
1868 ships
Ships built in Copenhagen